The Arboretum of the University of Central Florida is located on the main campus of the University of Central Florida in Orlando, Florida, United States. Covering , it contains more than 600 species of plants, including more than 100 bromeliads, in cultivated gardens.

History
During this time the director of the Arboretum was Dr. Henry O. Whittier. He would remain director of the Arboretum until his retirement in 2003, when Dr. Whittier was replaced as director by Dr. Martin Quigley, who served as director until 2009. In 2009, the Arboretum established a 0.15-ha organic community garden. In 2010, Dr. Patrick Bohlen was hired as the Director of Landscape and Natural Resources and Arboretum.

Natural areas
The northeast and southeast sections of campus are wetland preserves whose waters flow east and north into the little Econlockhatchee River, which in turn flows into the Big Econlockhatchee before it joins with the St. Johns River near State Highway 46.

The elevated northwest corner of campus is geologically ancient coastline ridge which, because of its excellent water drainage, includes nature preserve containing a small remnant of the easternmost longleaf pine and American turkey oak association in central Florida.  Most of the American turkey oak has disappeared from the highest part of the ridge, occupied by Alafaya trail.  Intermittent or Shallow ponds and a small  lake, Lake Claire, lie immediately to the east.  A small beach and some picnic pavilions are maintained for campus recreation.

Wild rosemary scrub and longleaf pine flatwoods habitats are eminently suitable for construction, but the great majority of Florida endemic (unique) species are found in these habitats.  The presence of these habitats within the Arboretum provides important opportunities for the introduction and preservation of threatened or endangered species.

The flatwoods are so flat that after heavy rains in may take water one or two days to drain off – so flat that the land slopes at a rate of not much more than 2-3 inches per mile!  The vegetation may look pretty boring from the highway, but that’s because of the repetitiveness of widely spaced longleaf pines and the apparent continuity of the saw palmetto and occasional shrubby oaks, lyonias, and hollies.  
On foot, walking the narrow trails through this habitat in different months of the year, the person taking the time for a closer look sees a wide variety of more seasonal plants which includes wild orchids, pitcher plants, sundews, bladderworts, lobelias, mints, tar flowers, blueberries, and others.

To maintain this biodiversity, the flatwoods and scrub ecosystems require fire to help clean up the dead and dried-up plant material that after some time can completely cover the ground.  When these materials are burnt they return their nutrients back into the ground as ash and the next generation of flowers and grasses can emerge and thrive.  This is the continuous cycle of growth, fire, and regeneration that these ecosystems need to be healthy.

Recreation
The Natural Areas are open to the public from sunrise to sunset, 7 days a week, 365 days a year. Pets are allowed as long as they are kept under control and on a  leash. Group tours are available by reservation. Volunteer opportunities are also available with more information available at the website.

See also 
 List of botanical gardens in the United States

External links 
 Arboretum official website

References 

Arboreta in Florida
Botanical gardens in Florida
University of Central Florida
Parks in Orange County, Florida
Tourist attractions in Orlando, Florida
Protected areas established in 1983
1983 establishments in Florida